Mitkino is a rural locality (a village) in Golovinskoye Rural Settlement, Sudogodsky District, Vladimir Oblast, Russia. The population was 1 as of 2010.

Geography 
Mitkino is located on the Soyma River, 16 km west of Sudogda (the district's administrative centre) by road. Kostrovo is the nearest rural locality.

References 

Rural localities in Sudogodsky District